KFIG (1430 AM) is a sports station in Fresno, California, United States.

KFIG 1430 AM is an ESPN Radio sports affiliate owned by Fat Dawgs 7 Broadcasting in Fresno, Ca. It is Fresno's Local Sports leader and includes programming like The Jose Gonzalez Show, Sportsline: The Bulldog Hour with Tony D & The Central Valley Sports Report. 1430 also airs high school baseball, basketball & football games. KFIG is the home of Fresno Grizzlies Baseball and airs games from professional sports leagues.

Previous history
The history of two Fresno area radio stations, KFIG and KYNO, is heavily intertwined, as follows:

KYNO began broadcasting early in 1948 on 1300 kHz with 1,000 watts full-time (c.f White's Radio Log, Spring 1948). 
  
KYNO 1300 AM increased to 5,000 watts days, and 1,000 watts nights in the early 1960s (c.f. White's Radio Log). Throughout the 1960s and 1970s, it was a Top 40 station, and was the #1 "Hooper" rated station in Fresno under the ownership of Eugene Chenault. KYNO was the testing ground for the "Boss Radio" format that would be adopted at such stations as KHJ, Los Angeles; KFRC, San Francisco and CKLW, Windsor, Ontario. In 1957, the Fresno AM dial consisted of KMJ (NBC) 580, KBIF 900, KFRE (CBS) 940, KEAP 980, KYNO (MBS) 1300, KMAK 1340, KARM (ABC) 1430, and KGST 1600 (cf. Fresno Bee Radio Log). KMAK was 1340 from 1953 to 1988 then KKAM from 1988 to 1992. KARM was 1430 and KFRE was 940. KFIG was an FM station first on 94.5 then moved to 101.1 in the early 1970s. KARM 1430 was changed to KFIG 1430, KYNO swapped frequencies with 940 becoming 940 KYNO then swapped calls with KFIG 1430 in October 2012 when John Ostland acquired KFIG from Fat Dawgs. On July 19, 2021, KYNO and its oldies format returned to 940 and the KFIG call letters and sports format returned to 1430 under the Fat Dawgs ownership.

References

External links

Sports radio stations in the United States
FIG
Radio stations established in 1938
1938 establishments in California